Telepathy is an album led by drummer Cindy Blackman which was recorded in 1992 and released on the Muse label.

Reception

Ron Wynn of AllMusic stated, "Drummer Cindy Blackman's third Muse album shows a maturity, confidence, and assertiveness that her two previous sessions lacked. ... While hard bop as well as some funk tinges are present, Cindy Blackman shows signs of being much more than another neo-bop follower on this date".

Ted Panken, writing for The Rolling Stone Jazz & Blues Album Guide, noted that the album "features more textural drumming from Blackman than on... earlier sessions," and commented: "This is interesting material that would have benefited from more assertive improvisations by her talented but inexperienced cohorts."

Track listing 
All compositions by Cindy Blackman except where noted
 "Reves Electriques du Matin (Electric Dreams in the Morning)" – 2:04
 "Spank" – 8:05
 "Telepathy" – 4:30
 "Well, You Needn't" (Thelonious Monk) – 6:05
 "Missing You" – 5:32
 "Clubhouse" (Jacky Terrasson) – 6:00
 "Reves Electriques de l'Apres Midi (Electric Dreams in the Afternoon)" – 1:09
 "Jardin Secret" – 6:40
 "Persuasion" – 5:23
 "Tune-Up" (Miles Davis) – 3:26
 "Reves Electriques de Minuit (Electric Dreams in the Evening)" – 1:31

Personnel 
Cindy Blackman - drums
Antoine Roney - soprano saxophone, tenor saxophone 
Jacky Terrasson - piano 
Clarence Seay - bass

References 

Cindy Blackman albums
1994 albums
Muse Records albums
Albums recorded at Van Gelder Studio